is a multi-purpose stadium at the Oga General Sports Park in Oga, Akita, Japan. The stadium was originally opened in 2005 and has a capacity of 9,000 spectators. It is one of the former home ground of Blaublitz Akita, and hosted the National Sports Festival of Japan in 2007.

References

External links
Home page

Football venues in Japan
Multi-purpose stadiums in Japan
Blaublitz Akita
Sports venues in Akita Prefecture
Athletics (track and field) venues in Japan
Oga, Akita
Sports venues completed in 2005
2005 establishments in Japan